William Lewis Dayton Jr. (April 13, 1839 – July 28, 1897) was an American lawyer, judge and diplomat who served as U.S. Minister to the Netherlands.  He was the son of William L. Dayton.

Biography
William Lewis Dayton Jr. was born in Princeton, New Jersey on April 13, 1839.  He graduated from Princeton University in 1858, studied law and became an attorney.

A Republican, from 1861 to 1865 he served as a Secretary at the U.S. Embassy in Paris when his father was U.S. Ambassador to France.  From 1865 to 1868 he served as Secretary to Governor Marcus L. Ward.

The younger Dayton was elected to the Trenton City Council in 1876 and served as Council President from 1876 to 1877.  From 1879 to 1881 he was Trenton's City Solicitor.

In 1882 Dayton was appointed Minister to the Netherlands, serving until 1885.  He served again as Trenton City Solicitor from 1889 to 1891.  He was appointed a Judge of the New Jersey Court of Appeals in 1896 and served until his death.

Dayton was a founder of Mercer Hospital, Counsel and a board of directors member for the Trenton Banking Company, a member of the Trenton Battle Monument Association, manager of the Trenton Saving Fund Society, and President of the Board of Trustees of Trenton's First Presbyterian Church.

Dayton died in Trenton on July 28, 1897.  He is buried in Trenton's Riverview Cemetery.

William L. Dayton Jr. was married to Harriet Maria Stockton, the daughter of Robert F. Stockton (1832–1898) and niece of John P. Stockton.

References

1839 births
1897 deaths
People from Princeton, New Jersey
Politicians from Trenton, New Jersey
Princeton University alumni
New Jersey lawyers
New Jersey Republicans
New Jersey state court judges
19th-century American diplomats
Ambassadors of the United States to the Netherlands
19th-century American judges
19th-century American lawyers